Olav Hordvik (26 December 1901 – 6 August 1979) was a Norwegian politician for the Liberal Party.

He was elected to the Norwegian Parliament from Hordaland in 1954, and was re-elected on three occasions. He had previously served as a deputy representative in the period 1950–1953.

Hordvik was born in Hamre and mayor of Hamre municipality in 1937–1938, and mayor of Åsane municipality in the periods 1945–1947, 1947–1951 and 1951–1955.

References

1901 births
1979 deaths
Liberal Party (Norway) politicians
Members of the Storting
20th-century Norwegian politicians